Tsel is a village and former military base in Asipovichy District of Mogilev Region in Belarus. It is part of the Pratasevichy Village Council (Selsoviet).

Tsel, whose name literally means target, was founded as a military base of the Red Army in 1936. A missile battalion from Klintsy was based in Tsel during the Soviet period. When the 22nd Missile Brigade relocated from Hungary to Belarus, it took over the base at Tsel. A village was built to house the families of the servicemen; servicemen and their families together numbered 1,500. The 465th Missile Brigade took over the base when the 22nd Brigade was disbanded in 2005. The base was abandoned in 2018 after the 465th relocated to the Yuzhny military base on the outskirts of Asipovichy. 

The village includes a primary and secondary school and is the location of dachas of Minsk and Asipovichy residents.

References 

Villages in Belarus
Asipovichy District
Military installations of the Soviet Union
Military installations of Belarus